Vitaliy Trushev is a Ukrainian Paralympic footballer.

Trushev won Gold medal in Paralympic football in 2008 Summer Paralympics in China. In 2012, he participated in 2012 Summer Paralympics in London where his team won 9–0 on September 1, 2012.

References

External links
 
 Vitaliy Trushev

Living people
Paralympic 7-a-side football players of Ukraine
Paralympic gold medalists for Ukraine
Date of birth missing (living people)
Paralympic silver medalists for Ukraine
7-a-side footballers at the 2004 Summer Paralympics
7-a-side footballers at the 2008 Summer Paralympics
7-a-side footballers at the 2012 Summer Paralympics
7-a-side footballers at the 2016 Summer Paralympics
Medalists at the 2004 Summer Paralympics
Medalists at the 2008 Summer Paralympics
Medalists at the 2012 Summer Paralympics
Medalists at the 2016 Summer Paralympics
Year of birth missing (living people)
Medalists at the 2000 Summer Paralympics
Paralympic medalists in football 7-a-side